Ludmiłówka  is a village in the administrative district of Gmina Dzierzkowice, within Kraśnik County, Lublin Voivodeship, in eastern Poland.

During the Holocaust, Grzegorz Korczyński's partisans murdered here about 100 Jews at this location in 1942/1943.

The village has a current population of 530.

References

Villages in Kraśnik County